Emile Christiaan Kriek (born 11 December 1989) is a former South African cricketer who played for Boland. He is a right-handed batsman and right-arm medium pace bowler. Kriek made his first-class debut on 8 January 2009 against South Western Districts.

References
Emile Kriek profile at CricketArchive

1989 births
Living people
Cricketers from Pretoria
South African cricketers
Boland cricketers